Beaty–Richmond Field at Carl Smith Stadium is a 3,086-capacity stadium in Wise, Virginia used mostly by the UVA Wise Cavaliers football and women's lacrosse teams.

The stadium is named for Carl Smith, a Wise native who donated large sums of money to the university system, and the field is named for Lelia Maude Beaty Richmond, another Wise native who was a supporter of the school.

External links
 Information at UVa. Wise

American football venues in Virginia
Lacrosse venues in the United States
College football venues
College lacrosse venues in the United States
Wise, Virginia
Sports venues completed in 1999
1999 establishments in Virginia